Strike Team Alpha is a 1978 board game published by Gamescience.

Gameplay
Strike Team Alpha is a game in which tactical infantry warfare is simulated between three enemy factions in the 22nd and 23rd centuries.

Reception
Patrick V. Reyes reviewed Strike Team Alpha in The Space Gamer No. 33. Reyes commented that "On a scale of one to ten, I'd give Strike Team Alpha an 8.6 for an overall rating. I feel it's a good game for the experience board-gamer who wants to try miniatures. The only problem is the price."

References

Board games introduced in 1978
Gamescience games